American Sign Language (ASL) developed in the United States and Canada, but has spread around the world. Local varieties have developed in many countries, but there is little research on which should be considered dialects of ASL (such as Bolivian Sign Language) and which have diverged to the point of being distinct languages (such as Malaysian Sign Language).

The following are sign language varieties of ASL in countries other than the US and Canada, languages based on ASL with substratum influence from local sign languages, and mixed languages in which ASL is a component. Distinction follow political boundaries, which may not correspond to linguistic boundaries.

Bolivian Sign Language

Bolivian Sign Language (Lengua de Señas Bolivianas, LSB) is a dialect of American Sign Language (ASL) used predominantly by the Deaf in Bolivia.

History
In 1973, American Sign Language was brought to Bolivia by Eleanor and Lloyd Powlison, missionaries from the United States. An indigenous sign language (or perhaps sign languages) existed before the introduction and adoption of American Sign Language, though it is unknown how widespread or unified it was.

The first book of LSB was published in 1992, but more than 90% of the signs were from ASL. Due to research work in the 1990s and 2000s a lot of expressions in LSB were collected by Bolivian Deaf, and education materials for learning LSB or teaching in LSB were published. The dependence on words used in ASL was reduced, but the usage of ASL words still is over 70%.

Today LSB is used by more deaf Bolivians than the reported 400 in 1988 in the Ethnologue report, due to the introduction of bilingual education (LSB as primary language and Spanish as secondary language) originally in Riberalta and its adoption to other schools in Bolivia with the support of the Education Ministry of Bolivia and the growing social exchange of the Deaf.

In 1988, there were a total of 9 deaf institutions in the country and 46,800 deaf Bolivians. In 2002 there were approximately 25 deaf schools.

Burundian Sign Language

Burundian Sign Language (LSB) is the national sign language of Burundi's Deaf community. It dates from Foster's introduction of ASL into Burundi, but has diverged since. Mouthing and initialization are mostly based on French. ASL signers from the USA are reported to have a hard time understanding videos in LSB, and LSB signers have a hard time understanding ASL videos, and Burundian Deaf consider their language to be distinct from ASL and from neighboring sign languages, such as Ugandan and Rwandan Sign.

Costa Rican Sign Language

Costa Rican Sign Language, also known New Costa Rican Sign Language or Modern Costa Rican Sign Language, is the national sign language of Costa Rica's Deaf community. It is used primarily by people born after 1960, and is about 60% cognate with American Sign Language (Woodward 1991, 1992). It is unrelated to two known village sign languages of Costa Rica, Bribri Sign Language and Brunca Sign Language.

Dominican Sign Language

Dominican Sign Language is a local variant of American Sign Language used in the Dominican Republic. Many deaf Dominicans use home sign, and are not fluent in Dominican Sign Language.

Francophone African Sign Language

Francophone African Sign Language (or LSAF) is the variety, or varieties, of American Sign Language (ASL) used in several francophone countries of Africa. Education for the deaf in these countries is based on ASL and written French; there is therefore a French influence on the language of the classroom.

With the exception of Algerian Sign Language, the sign languages of francophone Africa are unrelated to French Sign Language, except indirectly through their derivation from ASL. This is because most schools for the deaf in the region were founded by the American missionary Andrew Foster or by his students, starting in 1974. Chadian Sign Language may be closest to Nigerian Sign Language. A few countries have languages unrelated to either: Madagascar Sign Language derives from Norwegian SL, and Tunisian Sign Language is apparently a language isolate.

The relationship of LSAF to standard American Sign Language has not been systematically assessed. For instance, Gabonese Sign Language has diverged and may be a separate language, and Togo Sign Language is not mutually intelligible with standard American Sign Language.

Characteristics
As in other African derivations of ASL, the language has been affected by local gestures and conventions. This is especially true of taboo topics such as sex (Dalle 1996).

As an example of the French influence on francophone ASL, the word for 'she' is made by pointing with an L-shaped hand, rather than with a simple index finger, because the name of the letter el is homonymous with elle ('she') in French. It is not clear to what extent such influence continues outside the classroom.

Location
Francophone African countries which use ASL as the language of Deaf instruction are:
Senegal
Mauritania
Mali
Guinea
Ivory Coast
Burkina Faso
Togo
Benin
Niger
Chad (from Nigeria)
Central African Republic
Gabon
Republic of Congo (Brazzaville; from Nigeria)
Democratic Republic of Congo (Kinshasa; FSL is also used)
Burundi
Morocco

Haitian Sign Language

American Sign Language is taught in the schools of Haiti, but the local variant, known as Haitian Sign Language, is divergent enough to cause problems with mutual intelligibility.

Ghanaian Sign Language

Ghanaian Sign Language is the national sign language of deaf people in Ghana, descended from American Sign Language. It was introduced in 1957 by Andrew Foster, a deaf African-American missionary, as there had been no education or organizations for the deaf previously. Foster went on to establish the first school for the deaf in Nigeria a few years later, and Nigerian Sign Language shows influence from GSL. GSL is unrelated to indigenous Ghanaian sign languages such as Adamorobe Sign Language and Nanabin Sign Language.

There are nine schools for the deaf in Ghana.

Greek Sign Language

Indonesian sign languages

Jamaican Sign Language

Jamaican Sign Language (JSL) is a local variant of American Sign Language used in Jamaica. It is supplanting the indigenous Jamaican Country Sign Language.

Malaysian Sign Language

Moroccan Sign Language

Moroccan Sign Language (MSL) is the language of the deaf community of Tetouan and some other cities of Morocco.

American Peace Corps volunteers created Moroccan Sign Language in 1987 in Tetouan from American Sign Language (ASL) and the existing signs; there is less than a 50% lexical similarity with ASL. It is not clear if the 'existing signs' were home sign or an established village sign language. The language is used in three programs for the deaf, but not throughout the country: It is not used in the large cities of Rabat, Tangier, or Casablanca, for example. In Oujda, near the Algerian border, Algerian Sign Language is used, or at least the local sign language has been strongly influenced by it.

Nigerian Sign Language

Nigerian Sign Language, NSL is the national sign language of deaf people in Nigeria, however, Nigeria does not have a national sign language yet.  ASL (with a possible mix of Signed English) was introduced in 1960, a few years after Ghanaian Sign Language, by Andrew Foster, a deaf African-American missionary, thereby raising a signing system some scholars have referred to as a dialect of ASL. Deaf education in Nigeria was based on oral method and existing indigenous sign languages were generally regarded as gestural communication prior to Andrew Foster's arrival. The conventional "Nigerian Sign Language" today has been described as the "School Sign Language" and is coded as nsi on the repository of languages of the world by SIL International. There is a Ghanaian influence in NSL; both are based on American Sign Language. The School Sign Language has little relationship with the various Indigenous Nigerian sign languages such as Hausa Sign Language, Yoruba Sign Language, and Bura Sign Language. The Save the Deaf and Endangered Languages Initiative and Nigerian National Association of the Deaf have been working to document indigenous and national varieties of NSL both for research and reference for the Nigerian deaf population.

Chadian and Congolese teachers for the deaf are trained in Nigeria. There are deaf schools in Chad in N’Djamena, Sarh, and Moundou.

Panamanian Sign Language

Panamanian Sign Language (Lengua de señas panameñas, LSP) is one of two deaf sign languages of Panama. It derived from American Sign Language and influenced by Salvadoran Sign Language.

See also Chiriqui Sign Language.

Philippine Sign Language

Puerto Rican Sign Language

Puerto Rican Sign Language (PRSL) is a variety or descendant of American Sign Language, which was introduced to Puerto Rico in 1907. It is not clear how far PRSL may have diverged from ASL, but Ethnologue speaks of bilingualism in ASL as well as speakers who know only PRSL.

Sierra Leonean Sign Language

Sierra Leonean Sign Language is a variety or descendant of American Sign Language (ASL) used in schools for the deaf in Sierra Leone, or at least in the capital Freetown. As in much of West Africa, the first schools for the deaf were founded by the American missionary Andrew Foster or his students.

Selangor Sign Language

Selangor Sign Language (SSL), also known as Kuala Lumpur Sign Language (KLSL), is a sign language used in Malaysia. It was originally based on American Sign Language (ASL) but has diverged significantly enough to now be considered a language in its own right. Kuala Lumpur was formerly located in the state of Selangor before it became a federal territory in 1974.

Like Penang Sign Language (PSL), it now mainly used by older people, although many younger people can understand it.

Singapore Sign Language

Thai Sign Language

External links
Sophie Dalle, 1996–1997, Rapport de Stage: La language de signes au Congo (in French)

Bibliography
Kamei, Nobutaka ed. 2008. Langue des Signes d'Afrique Francophone (LSAF) (DVD). Fuchu: Research Institute for Languages and Cultures of Asia and Africa, Tokyo University of Foreign Studies.
Tamomo, Serge. 1994. Le language des signes du sourd Africain Francophone. Cotonou, Bénin: PEFISS.
Garay, S. (2004). Understanding the Panama Deaf Community & Sign Language: Lengua de Señas Panameñas. (Instructional CD) Asociación Nacional de Sordos de Panamá.
—— (1990). Panama's sign language dictionary: Lengua de señas panameñas. Asociación Nacional de Sordos de Panamá.

References

French Sign Language family
American Sign Language family
Languages of Bolivia
Languages of Ghana
Languages of Nigeria
Languages of Chad
Languages of the Republic of the Congo
Languages of Ivory Coast
Languages of Benin
Languages of Cameroon
Languages of Guinea
Languages of Togo
Languages of Gabon
Languages of Senegal
Languages of Mali
Languages of Burkina Faso
Languages of Niger
Languages of the Central African Republic
Languages of Mauritania
Languages of Costa Rica